Dolomittøyane  is a group of islands in Hinlopen Strait, Svalbard. They are located about five nautical miles south of the headland of Sparreneset, and extend over a length of about three miles, curving towards the spit of Gimleodden.

References

Islands of Svalbard